Nils Fischer (born 14 February 1987) is a retired German footballer who played as a right-back.

References

External links
 

1987 births
Living people
Sportspeople from Bielefeld
Association football defenders
German footballers
Arminia Bielefeld players
Wuppertaler SV players
VfL Osnabrück players
1. FC Saarbrücken players
FC 08 Homburg players
Bundesliga players
2. Bundesliga players
3. Liga players
Regionalliga players
Footballers from North Rhine-Westphalia
21st-century German people